The Zeitschrift für die Alttestamentliche Wissenschaft (ZATW/ZAW) is an academic German journal established in 1881. It is concerned with theological, linguistic and historical criticism of the Hebrew Bible. Formerly, it represented a strictly Protestant point of view on the Old Testament. At the present time, it is more ecumenical, also representing Catholic and Jewish points of view.

Its first editor was Bernhard Stade. 
Currently, the journal is edited by Hans-Christoph Schmitt and Ernst-Joachim Waschke and published by Walter de Gruyter. It is edited two times per year in both a printed version and an internet version. The majority of articles are written in German, but some of them are written in English and French.

A companion to the ZAW journal is the Zeitschrift für die Neutestamentliche Wissenschaft (ZNW).

See also 

 List of theological journals

External links 
 
 ZAW 1885

Biblical studies journals
Catholic theology and doctrine
Jewish theology
De Gruyter academic journals
Publications established in 1881
Multilingual journals
1881 establishments in Germany
Biannual journals